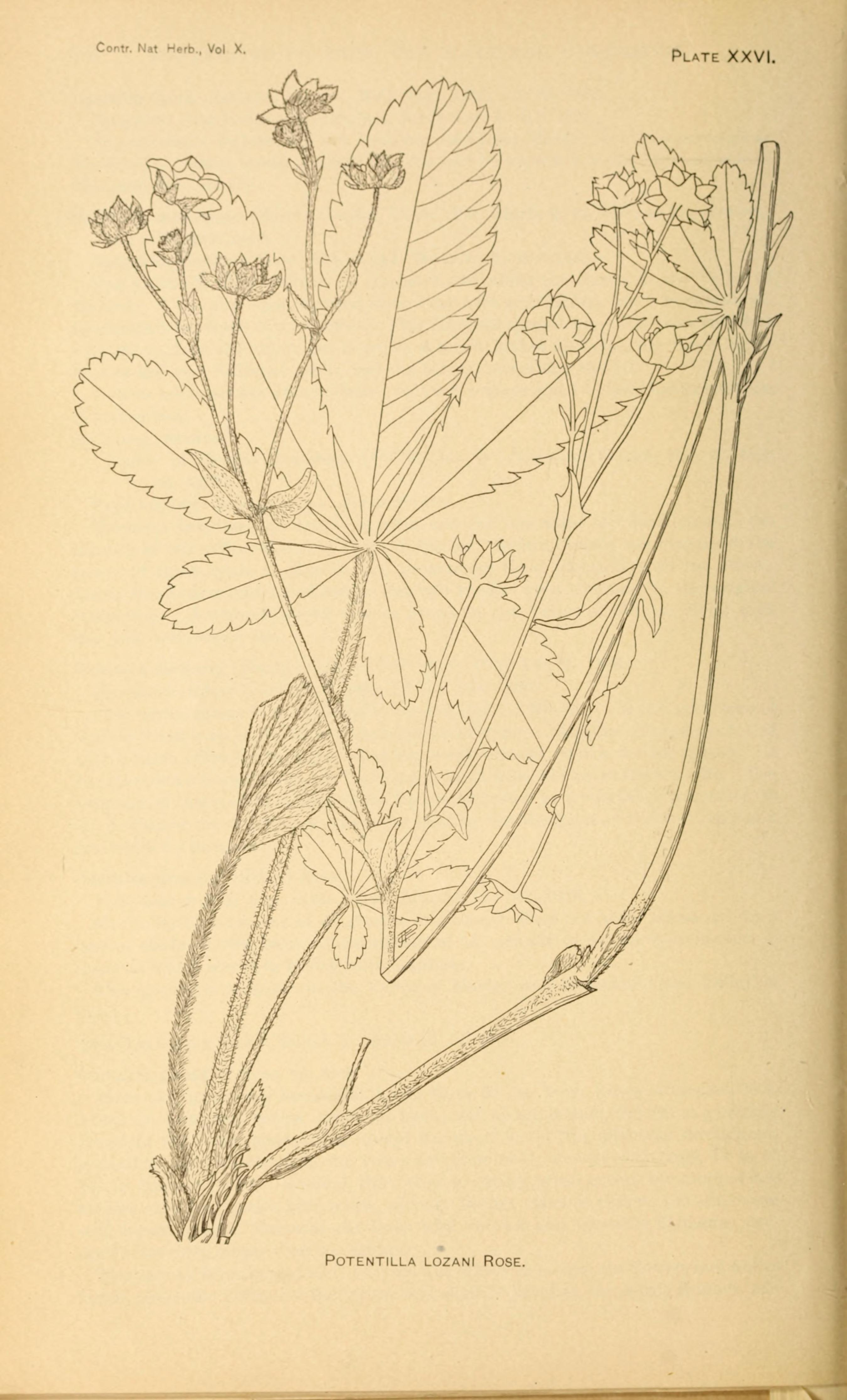

Scientific classification
- Kingdom: Plantae
- Clade: Tracheophytes
- Clade: Angiosperms
- Clade: Eudicots
- Clade: Rosids
- Order: Rosales
- Family: Rosaceae
- Genus: Potentilla
- Species: P. lozanii

Binomial name
- Potentilla lozanii Rose & J.H.Painter

= Potentilla lozanii =

Species of flowering plant

Potentilla lozanii is a species of Potentilla native to Hidalgo, Mexico.

== Description ==
It is a perennial herb growing from a woody caudex. The leaves are palmately divided, with 5 leaflets. The flowers have dark purple petals with notched tips. The sepals, stems, petioles, and parts of the leaf blades are covered in sparse, soft hairs.
